Acontia nubifera is a moth of the family Noctuidae. It is found in South America, including Argentina.

nubifera
Moths of South America
Moths described in 1910